Live at Last may refer to:

Albums
 Live at Last (Black Sabbath album)
 Live at Last (Bette Midler album)
 Live at Last (Enchant album)
 Live at Last (Maghostut Trio album)
 Live at Last (The Slickee Boys album)
 Live at Last (Steeleye Span album)
 Live at Last, an album by the Subdudes

Videos
 Live at Last (The Charlatans video)
 Live at Last (Anastacia video)